Yunupingu is the family name of a number of notable Aboriginal Australians from the Yolngu people of Arnhem Land, who are closely connected with the Marika and Gurruwiwi families.

Notable people with this name include:
 Djerrku (Eunice) Yunupingu (1945–2022), artist, mother of Witiyana Marika

Galarrwuy Yunupingu (born 1948), Australian leader in the struggle for Australian land rights, also known as Dr Yunupingu
 Gaymala (Nancy) Yunupingu (1935–2005), artist 
Gulumbu Yunupingu (1940s–2012), Australian artist and women's leader 
Geoffrey Gurrumul Yunupingu (1971–2017), aka Gurrumul, Australian multi-instrumentalist and singer in Yolngu and English, also known as Dr G. Yunupingu
 Malngay Yunupingu, band member of rock/reggae band East Journey
Mandawuy Yunupingu (1956–2013), Australian musician, educator and community leader, also known as Dr Yunupingu
Nyapanyapa Yunupingu (born 1945), Australian painter
Mungurrawuy Yunupingu (1905–1979), Gumatj leader, father of Galarrwuy, Gaymala, Gulumbu, Mandawuy, Nyapanyapa, and others
 Yirrnga Yunupiŋu, singer/songwriter of King Stingray, and former vocalist with Yothu Yindi (son of Gurrumul)
 Yalmay Marika Yunupingu (born 1956), artist and teacher-linguist at Yirrkala Community Education Centre (daughter of Mathaman Marika)

See also
Dr Yunupingu (disambiguation)